Sirish Gurung (born 11 August 1998) is a Nepalese competitive swimmer. He competed at the 2016 Summer Olympics in Rio de Janeiro, in the men's 100 meter freestyle and set a new national record in the event.  Gurung has also won the Nepal Open Water Swimming Championship for three consecutive times. 

From an early age, the Kathmandu-based kid has been the country's hope in a sport where Nepalis do not compete frequently in international tournaments. Gurung has been a force to be reckoned with both in and out of the water, winning several swimming championships, excelling in his education, mastering 11 musical instruments, and learning to drive at an early age of five.

Early life 
Sirish has always been a hyperactive free-spirit since his childhood that let him run around most of the time. Surprisingly, he learned driving bike, bus, truck and even crane at the age of 5! Such vibrant energy drew his parents attention and hence, they made him engaged in every extracurricular activity possible. But whether it’s football or piano classes, this mischievous kid always managed to escape juggling the rules and restrictions. Worn out parents finally got an idea to admit Sirish for swimming classes realizing that there is no escape out for him from the pool in a swimsuit.

As destined, his career as a swimmer kick-started when he won the trophy of the Youngest Swimmer at an age of 5. This recognition gave new confidence to Sirish. However, his tenacity for swimming grew stronger in 2008, when his two seniors got selected for the Beijing Olympics. He says, “This incident gave me an insight that swimming is not only a game but also a matter of pride. I instantly made up my mind to represent Nepal in the Olympics near future. This is how I started taking my training seriously since then.”  Nothing to surprise, his persistence hard work finally paid off when he represented Nepal in the Rio Olympics 2016 after 8 years. 

Gurung has always been fascinated by automobiles, and his parents did not object when he expressed an interest in driving. He could drive a vehicle, a truck, and a bike when he was six years old. Learning, according to Gurung, is about having the courage to take risks.

References

External links
 

1998 births
Living people
Nepalese male freestyle swimmers
Olympic swimmers of Nepal
Swimmers at the 2016 Summer Olympics
Swimmers at the 2014 Asian Games
Swimmers at the 2018 Asian Games
Asian Games competitors for Nepal
Sportspeople from Kathmandu
Gurung people
21st-century Nepalese people